Brandie Burton (born January 8, 1972) is an American professional golfer. In October 2019 her induction into the Southern California Golf Association Hall of Fame was announced, noting that she competed in five Solheim Cups, recorded 88 top 10 finishes and became the youngest female golfer to surpass $1 million in career earnings.

Amateur career
Burton was born in San Bernardino, California. She graduated from Eisenhower High School in Rialto, California in 1990. She won several amateur tournament including the 1989 U.S. Girls' Junior. She also was runner-up in the 1989 U.S. Women's Amateur to Vicki Goetze. She played on the U.S. Curtis Cup team in 1990. She played college golf at Arizona State University for one year (1989/1990), winning six tournaments.

Professional career
Burton turned professional in 1990 and earned her 1991 LPGA Tour through qualifying school. She was LPGA Tour Rookie of the Year in 1991. She has won five times on the tour, including two majors, the 1993 and 1998 du Maurier Classics. Her best finish on the money list is 3rd in 1993. She was a member of the U.S. Solheim Cup team in 1992, 1994, 1996, 1998 and 2000.

Amateur wins
1987 Junior World Golf Championships (Girls 15–17)
1988 PGA National
1989 Junior World Golf Championships (Girls 15–17), U.S. Girls' Junior
1990 North and South Women's Amateur, Broadmoor Championship

LPGA Tour wins (5)

LPGA Tour playoff record (1–2)

Major championships

Wins (2)

1Won in playoff by Burton 3-4.

Team appearances
Amateur
Curtis Cup (representing the United States): 1990 (winners)

Professional
Solheim Cup (representing the United States): 1992, 1994 (winners), 1996 (winners), 1998 (winners), 2000

References

External links

American female golfers
Arizona State Sun Devils women's golfers
LPGA Tour golfers
Winners of LPGA major golf championships
Solheim Cup competitors for the United States
Golfers from California
Sportspeople from San Bernardino, California
Sportspeople from Rialto, California
1972 births
Living people